Gabriel Pantelimon (born 30 November 1968) is a Romanian fencer. He competed in the individual and team épée events at the 1992 and 1996 Summer Olympics.

References

External links
 

1968 births
Living people
Romanian male fencers
Romanian épée fencers
Olympic fencers of Romania
Fencers at the 1992 Summer Olympics
Fencers at the 1996 Summer Olympics